Barrier Island is an island, 0.5 nautical miles (0.9 km) long, at the north end of the Vestfold Hills, lying just north of the entrance to Tryne Fjord in Tryne Sound. Mapped by Norwegian cartographers from air photos taken by the Lars Christensen Expedition, 1936–37. Visited in 1957 by an ANARE (Australian National Antarctic Research Expeditions) party and so named because the island appeared to form a barrier to the passage of icebergs up Tryne Fjord.

See also 
 List of antarctic and sub-antarctic islands

References 

Islands of Antarctica